Supriya Lele is an Indian-British designer with an eponymous fashion brand founded in 2016. Lele was a finalist of the LVMH Prize 2020 and shared the €300,000 prize fund with the other 7 finalists when the final leg of the competition was cancelled due to the COVID-19 pandemic.

Personal life 
Lele grew up in Meriden, West Midlands, UK, taking yearly trips to visit family in India during the holidays. Both of her parents are from India's central region—her mother from Nagpur, her father from Jabalpur. Her parents were both medics—her mother a clinical director and her late father a consultant specialist surgeon.

Education 
Lele started out at the University of Edinburgh, studying architecture but realising it wasn't for her, switched over to do an art foundation course. She also holds an MA from the Royal College of Art.

Work 
Lele's MA collection caught the eye of Fashion East director Lulu Kennedy and in 2017, she debuted her brand at London Fashion Week as part of the Fashion East showcase. In 2020, Lele was a finalist for the LVMH prize.

Awards and prizes 
 2017: Fashion East
 2018: BFC NewGen
 2020: LVMH Prize, one of eight finalists

References

English fashion designers
British women fashion designers
Alumni of the Royal College of Art
Alumni of the University of Edinburgh
Place of birth missing (living people)
Year of birth missing (living people)
Living people